A special administrative measure (SAM) is a process under United States law (see also USAM title 9 chapter 24 — Requests for Special Confinement Conditions) whereby the United States Attorney General may direct the United States Bureau of Prisons to use "special administrative measures" regarding housing of and correspondence and visitors to specific inmates. It includes prisoners awaiting or being tried, as well as those convicted, when it is alleged there is a "substantial risk that a prisoner's communications or contacts with persons could result in death or serious bodily injury to persons, or substantial damage to property that would entail the risk of death or serious bodily injury to persons." Such measures are used to prevent acts of violence or terrorism or disclosure of classified information.

The law is considered particularly controversial because it permits monitoring of attorney-client communications of designated prisoners. Initiated in November 2001, the Department of Justice considered this an expansion of an existing regulation. Formerly it was only allowed through a court order. It specified that information protected by attorney-client privilege could not be used for prosecution; however, communications related to ongoing or contemplated illegal acts was not covered."

As of May 22, 2009, 44 out of 205,000 federal inmates were subject to SAMs, 29 incarcerated on terrorism-related charges, 11 on violent crime-related charges and four on espionage charges. Well known individuals who have been under special administrative measures include American Taliban supporter John Walker Lindh and organized crime figure Frank Calabrese, Sr. Perhaps the best known application of this provision was the prosecution of attorney Lynne Stewart and interpreter Mohamed Yousry for passing messages between Omar Abdel-Rahman and his supporters in violation of a special administrative measure against communications. After her conviction, sentencing and re-sentencing to 10 years in prison, she appealed on freedom of speech grounds. Other cases include Robert Hanssen, Syed Fahad Hashmi (see below), and Dzhokhar Tsarnaev, Boston Marathon bomber, who never could speak privately to his attorneys.

See also
Civil liberties in the United States
Human rights in the United States

References

External links
My Student, the 'Terrorist': Syed Fahad Hashmi was held in pre-trial solitary confinement for three years, mostly under Special Administrative Measures.
ECL Submission for Solitary Confinement
Counsel complaint re SAMs

Penal system in the United States
Civil liberties in the United States